Theodore I of Corsica (25 August 169411 December 1756), born Freiherr Theodor Stephan von Neuhoff, was a German adventurer who was briefly King of Corsica. Theodore is the subject of an opera by G. Paisiello, Il re Teodoro in Venezia (1784, Vienna), and one of the six kings in Venice in Voltaire's Candide.

Biography
Theodor von Neuhoff was born in Cologne as the son of a Westphalian nobleman Baron Leopold Wilhelm von Neuhoff zu Pungelscheid and his wife, Amélie Collin. Educated at the court of France, he served first in the French army and then in that of Sweden. Baron de Goertz, minister to Charles XII, realizing Neuhoff's capacity for intrigue, sent him to England, and to Spain to negotiate with Cardinal Alberoni. Having failed in this mission he returned to Sweden and then went to Spain, where he served Alberoni until his exile, then the Baron Ripperda, and was made colonel and married one of the queen's ladies-in-waiting. Deserting his wife soon afterwards he repaired to France and became mixed up in John Law's financial affairs and the Mississippi Company boom; then he led a wandering existence visiting Portugal, the Netherlands, and Italy.

At Genoa, Neuhoff made the acquaintance of some Corsican rebels and exiles, and persuaded them that he could free their country from Genoese tyranny if they made him king of the island. With the help of the Bey of Tunis, he landed in Corsica in March 1736 with military aid. The islanders, whose campaign had not been successful, elected and crowned him king. He assumed the title of King Theodore I, issued edicts, instituted an order of knighthood, and waged war on the Genoese, at first with some success. But in-fighting among the rebels soon led to their defeat. The Genoese put a price on his head and published an account of his colourful past, and he left Corsica in November 1736, ostensibly to seek foreign assistance. After sounding out the possibility of protection from Spain and Naples, he set off to Holland where he was arrested for debt in Amsterdam.

On regaining his freedom, Theodore sent his nephew to Corsica with a supply of arms; he himself returned to Corsica in 1738, 1739, and 1743, but the combined Genoese and French forces continued to occupy the island. After that he fled to the Netherlands again and lived some years in exile in the manor house 't Velde near Zutphen. There he made plans for new actions to gain power again as king of Corsica. 1749 he arrived in England to seek support, but eventually fell into debt and was confined in a debtors' prison in London until 1755. He regained his freedom by declaring himself bankrupt, making over his kingdom of Corsica to his creditors, and subsisted on the charity of Horace Walpole and some other friends until his death in London in 1756, aged 62.

Although it is sometimes said that he married the daughter of Lord Lucan and Lady Honora Burke, his wife Catalina Sarsfield was in fact from a different branch of the Irish Catholic Sarsfield family, and was the daughter of David Sarsfield of County Limerick. He had one daughter and historical writer Colonel Frederick claimed to be his son. Some of Frederick’s descendants are the Meredith family who reside in Taumarunui in New Zealand.

A certain Colonel Frederick (c. 1725–1797), who claimed to be Theodore's son, was known as the Prince of Caprera. He served in the army of King Frederick II of Prussia and afterwards acted as agent in London for the duke of Württemberg. Frederick wrote an account of his purported father's life, Memoires pour servir a l'histoire de la Corse, and also an English translation, both published in London in 1768. In 1795 he published an enlarged edition, A Description of Corsica, with an account of its union to the crown of Great Britain. See also Fitzgerald, King Theodore of Corsica (London, 1890).

Epitaph

Neuhof was buried in the graveyard of St Anne's Church, Soho in central London. His epitaph was written by Horace Walpole, and can be seen on his gravestone:

Notes

References

Bibliography 
Bent, J. Theodore (1886). "King Theodore of Corsica", The English Historical Review, Vol. 1, No. 2, pp. 295–307.
Fitzgerald, Percy (1890). King Theodore of Corsica. London: Vizetelly.
André Le Glay (1907), Théodore de Neuhoff, roi de Corse, Imprimerie de Monaco (French).
Gasper, Julia (2012). Theodore von Neuhoff, King of Corsica: the Man Behind the Legend. University of Delaware Press.
Graziani, Antoine-Marie (2005). Le Roi Théodore. Paris: Tallandier, coll. « Biographie ». 371 p., 22 cm. – . 
Michel Vergé-Franceschi (2005), Pascal Paoli : Un Corse des Lumieres, Paris, Fayard (French).
Pirie, Valerie (1939). His Majesty of Corsica: The True Story of the Adventurous Life of Theodore 1st. London: William Collins & Sons.
Vallance, Aylmer (1956). The Summer King: Variations by an Adventurer on an Eighteenth-Century Air. London: Thames & Hudson.

External links

1694 births
1756 deaths
History of Corsica
Barons of Germany
18th-century monarchs in Europe
Self-proclaimed monarchy
Military personnel from Cologne
Heads of state of former countries
Heads of state of states with limited recognition
People imprisoned for debt
Burials at St Anne's Church, Soho
People from Cologne